Taffazul Islam Rahman (born 1983) is an English football manager. Grew up in Camden, Central London.

Career

Playing career

As a youth player, Rahman joined the youth academy of English third tier side Luton. After that, he joined the youth academy of QPR in the English second tier. After that, he joined the youth academy of English Premier League club Arsenal. Where he graduated through as a schoolboy and played in the youth and reserve team set up.

Managerial career
In 2007, Rahman was appointed youth academy coach at Arsenal in the English Premier League. In the summer of 2012 he completed the UEFA A license qualification with the English FA. In 2013, Rahman was appointed manager of the youth academy of Tottenham in the English Premier League. In 2018, he was appointed assistant manager of Guyana and made history by qualifying for the Gold Cup for the first time in the country's history.

References

1983 births
Living people
Association football forwards
English expatriate football managers
English expatriate sportspeople in Guyana
English football managers
English footballers
English people of Bangladeshi descent
Expatriate football managers in Guyana
Arsenal F.C. players